Francis Van Wyck Mason (November 11, 1901 – August 28, 1978) was an American historian and novelist. He had a long and prolific career as a writer spanning 50 years and including 78 published novels, many of which were well-received best sellers.

Biography

Early life and education
Van Wyck (pronounced Wike) Mason was born to a patrician Boston family which immigrated to North America during the 17th Century. His early life featured much adventure, even before he began writing. His first eight years he lived in Berlin and then Paris, where his grandfather served as U.S. Consul General, and during that time he learned the French language. Mason himself noted that he didn't learn English until he was nearly ten.  After a few years in Illinois he left for Europe in 1917, while still a teenager, to fight in World War I. Like many future writers, he was an ambulance driver for a while. He then managed to enlist in the French Army, where he received decorations as an artillery officer, including the Legion of Honor. On Armistice Day, he was only celebrating his 17th birthday, yet had already joined the United States Army and achieved the rank of Lieutenant. After the war he went to preparatory school, then attended Harvard University, where he received his Bachelor of Science degree in 1924. At one time during his college years, he was mistakenly arrested for murder.  Having borrowed a dinner jacket, he was identified wrongly as a waiter who had committed a murder.

His hopes of entering the diplomatic corps were thwarted after his father's death, so Mason started an import business instead and spent the next few years traveling the world buying antiques and rugs. His travels included Europe, Russia, the Near East, North Africa (nine weeks with his own caravan), the West Indies, Central Africa, and a ride across Central America on horseback. He lived in New York City, served in a cavalry unit of the National Guard, and played quite a bit of polo. He indulged an interest in hunting the rest of his life.

Writing career and personal life

By 1927 a chance meeting with one of his college professors, John Gallishaw, encouraged him to try writing. He attended Gallishaw's course in short fiction on the condition that he pay for the course out of future sales.  He married socialite Dorothy L. MacReady in New York City during November of that year. By May 1928 he had his first story published. He enjoyed immediate success selling to the pulp magazines, and sold 18 stories before his first rejection. The magazines paid well at that time, and he was soon able to build a comfortable home outside of Baltimore, Maryland. During 1930, he published his first novel, The Seeds Of Murder, which introduced Captain Hugh North, an agent of U.S. Army Intelligence. North was the hero in a long series of "intrigue" novels.

By 1931, he had settled into a career as an author of novels as well as short fiction, publishing his first historical novel in book form, Captain Nemesis, which was republished from an earlier pulp serial. The historical novel apparently did not sell well, because he resumed the mystery/intrigue genre, publishing a dozen or so volumes during the next seven years, including nine more about Hugh North. 

Mason was still writing historical stories for the pulps during this period and during 1938 resumed the genre for a major novel, Three Harbours, about the early phases of the American Revolution. By this time Mason was doing very well financially, with residences in Bermuda and Nantucket, as well as Maryland. When delivering the manuscript of Three Harbours from Nantucket, he was caught in the middle of the New England Hurricane of 1938. He made it to New York, and the book became very popular. It changed his emphasis to historical fiction for the rest of his career, though he continued to write Hugh North stories until 1968.

During the next few years, he wrote two companion books to Three Harbours – Stars on the Sea and Rivers Of Glory – as well as three more Hugh North mysteries. These books all sold well, especially Stars on the Sea, which was a top 10 bestseller for 1940, and Mason was very successful when the war interrupted his writing. He re-enlisted in the Army after Pearl Harbor and suspended his writing career, though he did manage to write some youth oriented war stories using the name Frank W. Mason. At this time he also published a couple of reworked pulp serials using the name Ward Weaver. During World War II, he worked as Chief Historian on General Eisenhower's staff, having achieved the rank of Colonel, and received numerous awards for bravery. His main responsibility was to document the war for future generations, but he also wrote a famous communiqué which announced the activities of D-Day to the world. As part of his duties he followed behind or with advancing troops as they worked their way into enemy territory and was one of the first into some of the concentration camps, including Buchenwald.

After the war, he settled into a more leisurely lifestyle of a little more than one book per year, which he was to maintain for the next quarter century. His style was well refined by this time, and he published a series of fairly popular books. He finished his American Revolution series with Eagle in the Sky in 1948. The next year he wrote Cutlass Empire, a popular novel about the famous buccaneer Henry Morgan, and during 1951 started a trilogy about the US Civil War.

During the 1950s, he rewrote more of his pulps for the paperback market and published a successful youth book named The Winter At Valley Forge during 1955. After that, he continued to write historical novels for youths. Also during the 1950's, he relocated from Baltimore to Bermuda. His wife was ill during this period and finally died in 1958.

He was soon remarried to Jean-Louise Hand, his long-time secretary. He spent the rest of his life in Bermuda, writing historical fiction for adults and youths, as well as several more Hugh North novels.

Death
He drowned in 1978, while swimming off the coast of Bermuda after having finished his final novel, Armored Giants, about the battle between the Monitor and Merrimack, which was published posthumously during 1980.

Writing

Overview
As a writer his career was based on popular fiction but included four main genres:  Pulp fiction, Mystery/intrigue (mainly based on series character Hugh North), historical fiction, and young adult fiction.

Writing Style
Mason's writing style was colorful though straightforward. His stories usually involve a heroic gentleman character. This hero may be forced to extreme measures by circumstances, but in the end, is victorious. Based on his own life which involved extensive travel, his stories are usually either set in exotic locations, as in the Hugh North stories, or involve main characters who are traveling extensively.

Pulp Fiction
His early work of adventure stories started with "The Fetish Of Sergeant M’Gourra" in May 1928 and continued until he started his more serious historical fiction during 1938.  He published stories involving war, jungle settings, the French Foreign Legion, and historical adventures. Several of these early historical stories were rewritten and published as paperback originals during the 1950s.  Mason's novel  The Barbarians (1954) is the story of Cealwyn, an Ancient Briton. Cealwyn is kidnapped by Carthaginians, but escapes and fights his former captors during the First Punic War.   The story was made into the movie Revak the Rebel.

Hugh North Series
Captain (later Major and Colonel) Hugh North was a prototype for James Bond: tough, athletic, a good shot and hand-to-hand fighter, as well as perfect in dress, manner, and speech for elegant society. The North series also sometimes foreshadowed actual military events, including a sneak attack on Pearl Harbor.  Mason created the character in 1930 and the series began with stories that had a fairly traditional mystery format. Through the years leading up to WW II these stories contain increasing levels of political intrigue but retained a murder mystery as a central theme.  After the war the series largely became more typical spy fiction with the emphasis on a secret mission.

Historical Fiction
His historical stories nearly always involve some kind of warfare and frequently include naval battles or long sea voyages. Most of his historical novels are prefaced by a fairly lengthy (usually several pages) discussion of the historical setting and context of his story. Often, with his fictional characters, Mason recounts the story of some significant but not widely known historical event. Actual historical people are occasionally introduced as minor characters of the plot. An interesting tidbit about Mason's work in this genre is that most of the titles have 13 letters.  When writing Rivers of Glory his secretary pointed out that the titles of the first two books in that series met that criterion, so Mason decided to go with it.

Bibliography

See also
 List of ambulance drivers during World War I

References

External links
 Review of Mason's Captain Judas by Andy Beau at swordandsorcery.org
 
 

1901 births
1978 deaths
American historical novelists
Writers from Boston
The Harvard Lampoon alumni
American emigrants to Bermuda
United States Army colonels
United States Army personnel of World War I
20th-century American novelists
20th-century American historians
American male novelists
20th-century American male writers
Novelists from Massachusetts
American mystery writers
American spy fiction writers
American male non-fiction writers
Historians from Massachusetts
Writers of historical fiction set in antiquity
Writers of historical fiction set in the early modern period
Writers of historical fiction set in the modern age